Roncq is a commune in the Nord department in northern France.

Population

Heraldry

Twin towns
It is twinned with Todmorden in Britain, Delbrück in Germany, and Selinkegny in Mali.

See also
Communes of the Nord department

References

External links

 Roncq website
 Roncq-Sélinkégny Twinning Association
 Website of the cinema

Communes of Nord (French department)
French Flanders